The 1929 Ball State Cardinals football team was an American football team that represented Ball State University during the 1929 college football season. In their second and final season under head coach Paul B. Parker, Ball State compiled a 0–7 record and was outscored 43 to 200.

Schedule

References

Ball State
Ball State Cardinals football seasons
Ball State Cardinals football